Menino is a surname. Notable people with the surname include:

 Alexandre Divanei Menino (born 1984), Brazilian futsal player
 Gabriel Menino (born 2000), Brazilian footballer
 Thomas Menino (1942–2014), American politician